Neocancilla is a genus of sea snails, marine gastropod mollusks in the subfamily Imbricariinae  of the family Mitridae.

Species
Species within the genus Neocancilla include:
 Neocancilla antoniae (H. Adams, 1871) 
 Neocancilla arenacea (Dunker, 1852)
 Neocancilla clathrus (Gmelin, 1791)
 Neocancilla hartorum Poppe, Salisbury & Tagaro, 2015
 Neocancilla hemmenae Salisbury & Heinicke, 1993
 Neocancilla kayae Cernohorsky, 1978
 Neocancilla maculosa (Gmelin, 1791)
 Neocancilla madagascariensis Herrmann, 2017
 Neocancilla papilio (Link, 1807)
 Neocancilla rufescens (A. Adams, 1853)
 Neocancilla takiisaoi (Kuroda, 1969)
 Neocancilla waikikiensis (Pilsbry, 1921)

Species brought into synonymy
 Neocancilla aliciae (Poppe, Tagaro & R. Salisbury, 2009): synonym of Gemmulimitra aliciae (Poppe, Tagaro & R. Salisbury, 2009)
 Neocancilla armonica (T. Cossignani & V. Cossignani, 2005): synonym of Imbricaria armonica (T. Cossignani & V. Cossignani, 2005)
 Neocancilla baeri H. Turner & Cernohorsky, 2003: synonym of Cancilla baeri (H. Turner & Cernohorsky, 2003) (original combination)
 Neocancilla carnicolor (Reeve, 1844): synonym of Domiporta carnicolor (Reeve, 1844)
 Neocancilla circula (Kiener, 1838): synonym of Domiporta circula (Kiener, 1838)
 Neocancilla condei (Guillot de Suduiraut, 2001): synonym of Scabricola condei Guillot de Suduiraut, 2001
 Neocancilla coriacea (Reeve, 1845): synonym of Scabricola coriacea (Reeve, 1845)
 Neocancilla daidaleosa B.-Q. Li & X.-Z. Li, 2005: synonym of Domiporta daidaleosa (B.-Q. Li & X.-Z. Li, 2005) (original combination)
 Neocancilla gloriola (Cernohorsky, 1970): synonym of Domiporta gloriola (Cernohorsky, 1970)
 Neocancilla granatina (Lamarck, 1811): synonym of Domiporta granatina (Lamarck, 1811)
 Neocancilla hebes (Reeve, 1845): synonym of Domiporta hebes (Reeve, 1845)
 Neocancilla latistriata Herrmann & R. Salisbury, 2012: synonym of Domiporta latistriata (Herrmann & R. Salisbury, 2012) (original combination)
 Neocancilla lavoisieri (Guillot de Suduiraut, 2002): synonym of Scabricola lavoisieri Guillot de Suduiraut, 2002
 Neocancilla pretiosa (Reeve, 1844): synonym of Imbricaria pretiosa (Reeve, 1844)
 Neocancilla rikae Guillot de Suduiraut, 2004: synonym of Cancilla rikae (Guillot de Suduiraut, 2004) (original combination)
 Neocancilla splendidula (R. Salisbury & Guillot de Suduiraut, 2003): synonym of Scabricola splendidula R. Salisbury & Guillot de Suduiraut, 2003
 Neocancilla vicdani (Cernohorsky, 1981): synonym of Scabricola vicdani Cernohorsky, 1981

References

 Cernohorsky W.O. (1970). Systematics of the families Mitridae and Volutomitridae. Bulletin of the Auckland Institute and Museum. 8: 1-190

External links
Cernohorsky W.O. (1966). A study of mitrid radulae and a tentative generic arrangement of the family Mitridae (Mollusca: Gastropoda). The Veliger. 9(2): 101-126

 
Mitridae